Pohádky tisíce a jedné noci (literally Tales of 1,001 Nights) is a 1974 Czech Republic animated film directed by Karel Zeman. The film combines the voyages of Sindbad the Sailor with elements of other tales from the Arabian Nights. Released in America as Adventures of Sinbad the Sailor, it is also known as A Thousand and One Nights. The film was animated using paper cutouts and draws its visual inspiration from Persian miniatures.

Synopsis

The First Voyage
Originally released as the short Dobrodružství námořníka Sindibáda (literally "Adventures of Sindbad the Sailor," 14 minutes, 1971).

The Second Voyage
Originally released as the short Druhá cesta námořníka Sindibáda (lit. "The Second Voyage of Sindbad the Sailor," 13 min., 1972).

The Third Voyage
Originally released as the short V zemi obrů (lit. "In the Land of Giants," 13 min., 1973).

The Fourth Voyage
Originally released as the short Magnetová hora (lit. "The Magnet Mountain," 15 min., 1973).

The Fifth Voyage
Originally released as the short Létající koberec (lit. "The Flying Carpet," 11 min., 1973).

The Sixth Voyage
Originally released as the short Mořský sultán (lit. "The Sultan of the Sea," 10 min., 1974).

The Seventh Voyage
Originally released as the short Zkrocený démon (lit. "Taming the Demon," 12 min., 1974).

External links

References

1970s fantasy adventure films
1974 films
1974 animated films
1970s Czech-language films
Czechoslovak animated films
Czech fantasy adventure films
Films directed by Karel Zeman
Czech animated films
Films based on Sinbad the Sailor
Films with screenplays by Karel Zeman
1970s Czech films
Czech animated adventure films
Czech animated fantasy films